Sajjad Hussain (born Mohamamd Sajjad Zaheer Hussain; 1 April 1974 is an Indian cricketer. He was a right-handed batsman and a right-arm bowler. He was born in Gauhati.

Hussain began his career for Assam Under-16s at the age of just 12 years old. Having played just three games in the 1992-93 Vijay Merchant Trophy competition, it wasn't until three seasons later he picked up his next appearance for the Under-16s in 1995–96. Hussain played in both the Vijay Merchant and Vijay Hazare trophy competitions that year, and in the following season, moved up to the Under-19s team.

Hussain made four appearances for Tripura, in the one-day Ranji Trophy. The team lost every game in the season's competition.

Hussain made his debut for Assam in the 2003-04 Ranji Trophy, against Karnataka, scoring just two runs in the second innings of the match.

Hussain's second and final first-class appearance for the team came in the following year's competition, against Hyderabad, against whom Assam lost by an innings margin.

External links
Sajjad Hussain at CricketArchive 

1974 births
Living people
Indian cricketers
Assam cricketers
Tripura cricketers